Pinson is a city in Jefferson County near Birmingham, Alabama, United States, northwest of Center Point.  As of the 2010 census, the population was 7,163.

History
Pinson was incorporated in March 2004.

Geography
This city is located at  (33.686301, -86.681913).

Pinson is located in an area of SW - NE parallel ridges, with occasional rock outcrops, especially toward the east-facing ridge crests. Pinson is home to the Turkey Creek Nature Preserve and the Alabama Butterbean Festival.

The Palmerdale Homesteads are located within the city limits of Pinson. The Palmerdale Homesteads were the first of five farmers' resettlement communities built in Alabama under President Franklin Roosevelt's New Deal in the 1930s. The first of the 102 homesteads were completed in 1935. A community store and elementary school/community center were completed in 1937 to serve the farming community.

Climate

Demographics

Note: Census demographic data were enumerated for the Census-Designated Place (CDP) for somewhat different boundaries prior to incorporation in 2004. The 1990 population of 10,987 was for the CDP of Pinson-Clay-Chalkville, which was subdivided in 2000 into their own separate CDPs. Therefore, exact population for the Pinson portion in 1990 cannot be ascertained

2000 census
At the 2000 census, there were 5,033 people, 1,853 households, and 1,450 families living in the community. The racial makeup of the community was 8.33% Black or African American, 88.1%  White, 0.32% Native American, 0.40% Asian, 0.02% Pacific Islander, 0.34% from other races, and 0.76% from two or more races. 2.27% of the population were Hispanic or Latino of any race.

Of the 1,853 households 41.4% had children under the age of 18 living with them, 59.8% were married couples living together, 15.3% had a female householder with no husband present, and 21.7% were non-families. 19.0% of households were one person and 6.3% were one person aged 65 or older. The average household size was 2.71 and the average family size was 3.08.

The age distribution was 28.3% under the age of 18, 9.7% from 18 to 24, 31.7% from 25 to 44, 20.6% from 45 to 64, and 9.8% 65 or older. The median age was 33 years. For every 100 females, there were 93.5 males. For every 100 females age 18 and over, there were 88.8 males.

The median household income was $39,583 and the median family income  was $48,707. Males had a median income of $33,843 versus $25,112 for females. The per capita income for the community was $17,704. About 8.6% of families and 10.3% of the population were below the poverty line, including 12.2% of those under age 18 and 10.9% of those age 65 or over.

2010 census
At the 2010 census, there were 7,163 people, 2,731 households, and 2,074 families living in the community. The racial makeup of the community was 79.0% White, 17.0% Black or African American, 0.2% Native American, 0.4% Asian, 0.0% Pacific Islander, 2.2% from other races, and 1.0% from two or more races. 3.7% of the population were Hispanic or Latino of any race.

Of the 2,731 households 32.0% had children under the age of 18 living with them, 58.0% were married couples living together, 13.7% had a female householder with no husband present, and 24.1% were non-families. 20.9% of households were one person and 6.5% were one person aged 65 or older. The average household size was 2.62 and the average family size was 3.04.

The age distribution was 24.4% under the age of 18, 8.0% from 18 to 24, 27.8% from 25 to 44, 27.9% from 45 to 64, and 11.9% 65 or older. The median age was 38 years. For every 100 females, there were 91.7 males. For every 100 females age 18 and over, there were 89.9 males.

The median household income was $56,863 and the median family income  was $63,221. Males had a median income of $41,719 versus $36,066 for females. The per capita income for the community was $23,902. About 4.5% of families and 5.7% of the population were below the poverty line, including 8.1% of those under age 18 and 3.2% of those age 65 or over.

2020 census

As of the 2020 United States census, there were 7,215 people, 2,711 households, and 1,997 families residing in the city.

Education
 Pinson Valley High School - Located on Highway 75 in Pinson. Grades 9-12.
 Rudd Middle School- Grades 6–8.
 Kermit Johnson Elementary- Grades 3–5.
 Pinson Elementary School- Grades K-2.

Media
Three newspapers serve Pinson:  
 The Trussville Tribune, a weekly newspaper based in nearby Trussville, which publishes on Wednesdays
 The North Jefferson News, a weekly newspaper based in nearby Gardendale, which publishes on Wednesdays 
 The Birmingham News, the major metro-area newspaper that publishes Wednesdays, Fridays and Sundays

Notable people
 Ed Chandler - former Major League Baseball player
 William Engesser (February 21, 1939 – June 20, 2002) was an American film actor and 7'3" tall.
 Samantha Francis - contestant on Americas Next Top Model cycle 8, Professional international Model
 Terry Hoeppner - assistant coach at Pinson (1974–75), Later head coach for the Indiana University football team
 Desmond Jennings - Major League Baseball player
 Terry Jones - former outfielder for the Montreal Expos and Colorado Rockies
 Bo Nix - current quarterback for the Oregon Ducks
 Melinda Toole - former Miss Alabama

References

External links
City of Pinson Official website
The Pinson News
Pinson Public Library

Cities in Alabama
Cities in Jefferson County, Alabama
Birmingham metropolitan area, Alabama